The Engels MI was a Russian floatplane/fighter developed in 1916. It was a parasol cantilever flying boat with a V-Section hull, and downswept wingtips incorporating flotation chambers.

Production history
In 1916 the Russian government expressed a need for a flying counter-float-plane against the German Albatros W 4. Y.E. Engels came up with the Engels MI, and after initial testing an order for 50 was placed on 27 April 1917. Only three were produced by October 1917, and as a result production quietly stopped.

Operational history
One aircraft survived the Russian Revolution, and was delivered to the Naval Aviation School at Nizhny Novgorod in 1920.

List of operators

Imperial Russian Air Service

Soviet Air Force

Specifications

References 

1910s Russian fighter aircraft
Flying boats
MI
Single-engined pusher aircraft
Parasol-wing aircraft
Aircraft first flown in 1920
Rotary-engined aircraft